Chad Smith's Bombastic Meatbats is an American instrumental funk rock band from Los Angeles, California. It consists of Red Hot Chili Peppers' drummer Chad Smith, guitarist Jeff Kollman (from Cosmosquad), bassist Kevin Chown (Uncle Kracker, Tarja Turunen), and Ed Roth (Ronnie Montrose, Gamma).

The group formed accidentally in 2007 with Jeff, Ed, and Chad being the backup band for Glenn Hughes.  The trio would do impromptu instrumental jams while warming up for Hughes' sessions and they decided to form a group adding bassist, Kevin Chown in 2008.

Being based in Los Angeles, Bombastic Meatbats regularly perform at Don Randi's jazz club, the Baked Potato.  Depending upon Chad Smith's touring schedule, the Bombastic Meatbats have dubbed both Kenny Aronoff and Matt Sorum honorary Meatbats, as they have subbed for Chad at various shows on the drums.

In May 2010, Bombastic Meatbats performed on the 40th Anniversary Baked Potato Jazz Festival at John Anson Ford Amphitheater in Hollywood, CA.  Their second CD, More Meat, was released on October 19, 2010. The band's first live album, Live Meat And Potatoes was released on May 21, 2012.

Discography
 Meet the Meatbats (September 15, 2009)
 More Meat (October 19, 2010)
 Live Meat And Potatoes (May 21, 2012)

References

Seaver, Morley. "Chad Smith (Bombastic Meatbats)", Anti-Music, September 21, 2009. 
Firecloud, Johnny. "The Chili Peppers drummer explains his new project", Crave Online, September 17, 2009. 
Editor. "Chad Smith's Bombastic Meatbats - Meet The Meatbats", Type 3 Media, September 16, 2009. 
Huberty, Mike. "Chad Smith's Bombastic Meatbats", Maximum Ink Magazine, September 15, 2009.
Editor. "Meet The Meatbats Review", Ultimate Guitar, September 15, 2009.
Garcia, AJ. "Chad Smith's Bombastic Meatbats: Meet The Meatbats (2009)", Shakefire, September 4, 2009. 
Baltin, Steve. "Chad Smith Makes Music For Sinatra's Dirty Deeds", Spinner, August 27, 2009. 
Bosso, Joe. "Side project, the Bombastic Meatbats", Music Radar, August 24, 2009. 
Florino, Rick. "Chad Smith's Bombastic Meatbats", Artist Direct, August 24, 2009. 
Marchese, David. "Q&A:  Red Hot Chili Pepper Chad Smith", Spin, August 26, 2009.
Graff, Gary. "Chad Smith's Bombastic Meatbats Looming", Billboard, July 31, 2009. 
Friday Morning Quarterback (FMQB). "Chad Smith: Chili Peppers Ending Hiatus In October", FMQB Official Webpage, July 31, 2009. 
Amendola, Billy. "Red Hot Chili Peppers drummer Chad Smith takes a much-needed break", Modern Drummer Magazine, June 11, 2008. 
Henderson, Maya Dawn. "Chad Smith's Bombastic Meatbats", All Access Magazine, May 15, 2008. 
Red Hot Chili Peppers. "Chad Smith's Bombastic Meatbats", Red Hot Chili Peppers Official Webpage, April 18, 2008.

External links
 Bombastic Meatbats Facebook
 Bombastic Meatbats label page
 Chad Smith's Bombastic Meatbats - Sabian LIVE at the NAMM Show 2010

Funk rock musical groups
Musical groups from Los Angeles
American instrumental musical groups